

England

East Midlands (44 then 46)

Derbyshire (10 then 11)

Leicestershire (10)

Lincolnshire (7)

Northamptonshire (6 then 7) 

1seat won by Labour in a 2012 by-election

Nottinghamshire (11)

East of England (56 then 58)

Bedfordshire (6)

Cambridgeshire (7)

Essex (17 then 18)

Hertfordshire (11)

Norfolk (8 then 9)

Suffolk (7)

Greater London (74 then 73)

North East London Boroughs (23 then 22) 
The boroughs of Enfield, Haringey, Islington, Hackney, Tower Hamlets, Newham, Waltham Forest, Redbridge, Barking & Dagenham and Havering.

North West London Boroughs (20) 
The boroughs of Hillingdon, Harrow, Brent, Ealing, Barnet, Camden, Hammersmith & Fulham, Kensington & Chelsea and Westminster, and the City of London.

South East London Boroughs (16) 
The boroughs of Lambeth, Southwark, Lewisham, Bromley, Greenwich and Bexley.

South West London Boroughs (15) 
The boroughs of Hounslow, Richmond, Kingston, Wandsworth, Merton, Sutton and Croydon.

1MP sat as an Independent Conservative from Sep 2007 and an independent from Oct 2008

Seats:

Votes:

London total seats

North East England (30 then 29)

Cleveland (6) 

1 Seat won by the Conservatives in a May 2021 by-election

Durham (7)

Northumberland (4)

Tyne and Wear (13 then 12)

North West England (76 then 75)

Cheshire (11) 

1seat gained by the Conservatives in a May 2008 by-election

Cumbria (6)

Greater Manchester (28 then 27) 

1MP sat as an independent from Dec 2015

Lancashire (15 then 16) 

1MP sat as an independent Sep 2013 - Apr 2014

Merseyside (16 then 15) 

1MP sat as an independent from Sep 2007

South East England (83 then 84)

Berkshire (8)

Buckinghamshire (7) 

1MP sat as Speaker from Jun 2009

East Sussex (8)

Hampshire (17 then 18) 

1MP sat as an independent from Jun 2013

2MP sat as an independent from Oct 2002

Isle of Wight (1)

Kent (17)

Oxfordshire (6)

Surrey (11)

West Sussex (8)

South West England (51 then 55)

Avon (10 then 11)

Cornwall (5 then 6)

Devon (11 then 12)

Dorset (8)

Gloucestershire (6)

Somerset (5)

Wiltshire (6 then 7)

West Midlands (59)

Hereford and Worcester (8)

Shropshire (5) 

1MP defected to the Liberal Democrats shortly after election

Staffordshire (12)

Warwickshire (5 then 6)

West Midlands (county) (29 then 28) 

1MP sat as Independent Labour from Oct 2006

Yorkshire and the Humber (56 then 54)

Humberside (10)

North Yorkshire (8)

South Yorkshire (15 then 14) 

1MP sat as an independent May 2010 - Feb 2011

2MP sat as an independent Oct 2010 - Jul 2012

West Yorkshire (23 then 22) 

1seat won by Respect in a 2012 by-election

Northern Ireland (18) 

1MP sat as an independent from Jun 2003 - Jan 2004

2MP sat as an independent from Jun 2003 - Jan 2004

3MP sat as an independent from Jun 2003 and defected to the Democratic Unionists in Jan 2004

Scotland 

The Fifth Periodical Review of the Boundary Commission for Scotland related the boundaries of new constituencies to those of Scottish local government council areas and to local government wards. Apart from a few minor adjustments, the council area boundaries dated from 1996 and the ward boundaries dated from 1999. Some council areas were grouped to form larger areas and, within these larger areas, some constituencies straddle council area boundaries.

Dumfries and Galloway (2 then 1)

Scottish Borders (2)

Lothian (10 then 9) 

1MP sat as an independent from Sep 2015

Strathclyde (32 then 25) 

1MP sat as an independent from Nov 2015

2seat gained by the SNP in a Jul 2008 by-election

3seat gained by Labour in a Nov 2009 by-election

4MP defected to the Respect Party in Jan 2004

Tayside (6 then 7)

Central (4 then 2)

1MP sat as an independent from Feb 2012

Fife (5 then 4)

1seat gained by the Liberal Democrats in a Feb 2006 by-election

Grampian (7 then 6)

Highland (5)

Wales (40)

Gwynedd (4 then 3) 

Votes:

Clwyd (6 then 7) 

In 2003 the border between Gwynedd and Clwyd was shifted. Conwy and Meirionydd Nant Conwy went from being entirely within Gwynedd to being split between Gwynedd and Clwyd.

Dyfed (5) 

Votes:

Powys (2)

West Glamorgan (5)

Mid Glamorgan (6)

South Glamorgan (5)

Gwent (7) 

Seats:

See also 

1997
1990s in the United Kingdom
2000s in the United Kingdom
2010s in the United Kingdom
2020s in the United Kingdom